TerraFire is a multidirectional shooter for MS-DOS. It was originally released on October 1, 1997 as shareware with a demo limiting the player to only the first eight levels. In 2005, TerraFire was re-released as freeware.

The game is best called a shoot 'em up, but unlike most games of this genre, the player is free to move in any direction, with physics similar to the 1979 arcade game Asteroids. Bullet patterns from enemies and obstacles are also far more sparse and predictable, and there are no bosses. The full version of the game has a total of 27 levels, where every fourth level is a bonus level which is a clone of the aforementioned Asteroids. The normal levels, which scroll both horizontally and vertically and wrap horizontally, have gravity and are completed by finding a nuke and dragging it out of the top of the level.

TerraFire uses pre-rendered 3D graphics and animation.

References

External links 
Official site

1997 video games
Multidirectional shooters
DOS games
Video games developed in the United Kingdom
Windows games